The mimosa stem-mining moth (Neurostrota gunniella) is a moth of the family Gracillariidae. It is known from Costa Rica, Cuba, Mexico and Texas, as well as Thailand and the Northern Territory in Australia, where it was introduced in 1989 to control Mimosa pigra.

The wingspan is about 8 mm. Adults are brown with a white stripe along the inner margin of each forewing. When in its rest position, it typically has its wings folded around the body, and its legs out.

The larvae feed on Mimosa asperata, Mimosa pigra, Neptunia oleracea and Neptunia plena. Mimosa pigra is the main larval host plant. The larvae bore the stem of their host plant, not merely under the epidermis but actually boring into the pith of the stem.

References

Gracillariinae
Lepidoptera used as pest control agents